Capo di Milazzo is a thin peninsula on the north eastern part of the island of Sicily which extends into the Tyrrhenian Sea towards the Lipari Islands. The town of Milazzo is located on the centre of the peninsula.

See also
Capo Milazzo Lighthouse

References

Peninsulas of Italy
Landforms of Sicily